Dyspessa alpherakyi is a species of moth of the family Cossidae. It was described by Hugo Theodor Christoph in 1885. It is found in Transcaucasia (Georgia, Azerbaijan) and Armenia.

References

Dyspessa
Moths described in 1885
Moths of Europe
Moths of Asia